Edward McCaffery (born c. 1959) is an American tax law professor at the University of Southern California Law School (USC) and also a visiting professor of Law and Economics at the California Institute of Technology (Caltech).

An internationally recognized expert in tax law, McCaffery studies tax policy, tax structures, public finance theory, including behavioral public finance, as well as property law and theory, intellectual property, and law and economics.

At USC he is Robert C. Packard Trustee Chair in Law and Professor of Law, Economics and Political Science, where he teaches courses on federal income taxation, property, intellectual property, and tax policy; at Caltech, he teaches courses concerning the intersection of law and economics, and courses concerning the intersection of law and technology.

McCaffery's scholarship has been widely cited by economists, government officials, journalists and policy analysts. In addition to numerous law review articles, McCaffery has recently written two books: Fair Not Flat: How to Make the Tax System Better and Simpler (advocating a progressive consumption tax based on spending rather than income) and Taxing Women (discussing the gender inequity of the current U.S. income tax code which penalizes working women).

Other publications include: Behavioral Public Finance (co-editor), Rethinking the Vote: The Politics and Prospects of American Election Reform (co-editor).

His other writings include "Cognitive Theory and Tax", "Framing the Jury: Cognitive Perspectives on Pain and Suffering Awards" (with Daniel Kahneman and Matthew Spitzer), and "Slouching Towards Equality: Gender Discrimination, Market Efficiency, and Social Change." McCaffery has served as an official consultant to the Russian Federation to help design a comprehensive tax code.

A summa cum laude graduate of Yale University, McCaffery received his J.D. magna cum laude from Harvard Law School and a master's degree in economics from the University of Southern California. He served as a clerk to Chief Justice Robert N. Wilentz of the New Jersey Supreme Court and was an attorney with Titchell, Maltzman, Mark, Bass, Ohleyer & Mishel before joining the USC Law faculty in 1989. He held the Maurice Jones, Jr., Professorship in Law from 1998 to 2004 and has served as a visiting professor of law and economics at Caltech since 1994. He has chaired the USC Institute on Federal Taxation since 1997, and he found the USC–Caltech Center for the Study of Law and Politics and served as its director from 2000 to 2003. He is an elected fellow of the American Law Institute (ALI) and the American College of Tax Counsel. McCaffery also Senior Counsel in the Los Angeles office of Seyfarth Shaw LLP.

External links
Edward McCaffery on USC Law School website
Edward McCaffery on Seyfarth Shaw LLP website

1958 births
Living people
American legal scholars
Yale University alumni
Harvard Law School alumni
University of Southern California alumni
University of Southern California faculty